The 12063 / 12064 Haridwar–Una Link Jan Shatabdi Express is a Superfast Express train of the Jan Shatabdi category belonging to Indian Railways – Northern Railway zone that runs between  and Una in India.

It operates as train number 12063 from Haridwar Junction to Una and as train number 12064 in the reverse direction, serving the state of Uttarakhand, Uttar Pradesh, Haryana, Chandigarh, Punjab & Himachal Pradesh.

Coaches

The 12063 / 64 |Haridwar–Una Link Jan Shatabdi Express presently has only 2 Second Class seating coaches. It does not have a pantry car.

As is customary with most train services in India, coach composition may be amended at the discretion of Indian Railways depending on demand.

Service

The 12063 Haridwar–Una Link Jan Shatabdi Express covers the distance of 368 kilometres in 7 hours 40 mins (48.00 km/hr) & in 8 hours 55 mins as 12064 Una–Haridwar Link Jan Shatabdi Express (41.27 km/hr).

Despite the average speed of the train being below 55 km/hr, its fare includes a Superfast Express surcharge as both the trains to which its coaches are attached. i.e. 12053 / 54 Amritsar Haridwar Jan Shatabdi Express & 12057 / 58 Una Jan Shatabdi Express are classed as Superfast Express.

Routeing

The 12063 / 64 Haridwar–Una Link Jan Shatabdi Express runs from Haridwar Junction via , Ambala Cant Junction, Rupnagar to Una.

Traction

As the route is partly electrified & due to the train being attached to 2 different trains, a Ludhiana-based WDM-3A locomotive hauls the train until Ambala Cant Junction along with the 12053 / 54 Amritsar Haridwar Jan Shatabdi Express, handing over to a Ghaziabad-based WAP-5 which powers the train along with the Una Jan Shatabdi Express for the remainder of the journey.

Timings

12064 Una–Haridwar Link Jan Shatabdi Express leaves Una every Monday, Wednesday & Saturday at 05:00 hrs IST and reaches Haridwar Junction at 13:55 hrs IST the same day.

12063 Haridwar–Una Link Jan Shatabdi Express leaves Haridwar Junction every Tuesday, Friday & Sunday at 14:30 hrs IST and reaches Una at 22:10 hrs IST the same day.

References

External links

Rail transport in Haryana
Rail transport in Himachal Pradesh
Jan Shatabdi Express trains
Trains from Haridwar
Transport in Una, Himachal Pradesh